Maksut Leshteni (born 30 January 1946) is an Albanian footballer. He played in two matches for the Albania national football team in 1971.

References

External links
 

1946 births
Living people
Albanian footballers
Albania international footballers
Place of birth missing (living people)
Association footballers not categorized by position